Norway competed at the 2015 European Games, in Baku, Azerbaijan from 12 to 28 June 2015.

The 57 Norwegian athletes were presented at 27 April 2015.

Medalists

Archery

Boxing

 Men's 64 kg – Salavat Khatuev

Canoe sprint

 Men's – Daniel Salbu
 Women's – Mira Verås Larsen

Cycling

BMX
Men's race – Tore Navrestad

Mountain biking
Men's race – Sondre Kristiansen

Road
 Men's time trial – Reidar Bohlin Borgersen
 Women's road race – Miriam Bjørnsrud, Cecilie Gotaas Johnsen
 Women's time trial – Cecilie Gotaas Johnsen

Diving

Women's – Julie Synnøve Thorsen, Anne Vilde Tuxen

Gymnastics

Artistic
 Men's – Pietro Giachino, Marcus Konradi, Stian Skjerahaug
 Women's – Sofie Bråthen, Dina Nygaard, Martine Rustøen Skregelid

Fencing

Men's individual épée – Bartosz Piasecki

Karate

Women's – Bettina Alstadsæther

Shooting

 Men's rifle – Ole Magnus Bakken, Stian Bogar, Odd Arne Brekne, Ole-Kristian Bryhn, Are Hansen
 Men's pistol – Pål Hembre
 Men's skeet – Tore Brovold
 Women's rifle – Malin Westerheim

Swimming

Men's – Eivind Bjelland, Ole-Mikal Fløgstad, Erik Årsland Gidskehaug, Marius Solaat Rødland, Mads Henry Steinland
Women's – Sigurd Holten Bøen, Ariel Braathen, Marte Løvberg

Taekwondo

Men's – Richard Ordemann
Women's – Tina Røe Skaar

Triathlon

Men's – Kristian Blummenfelt, Gustav Iden
Women's – Lotte Miller

Volleyball

Beach

 Men's tournament – Øivind Hordvik/Morten Kvamsdal
 Women's tournament – Victoria Faye Kjølberg/Janne Kongshavn Hordvik

Wrestling

Men's Greco-Roman
 Felix Baldauf
 Stig André Berge
 Petter Karlsen
 Marius Thommesen
 Rasmus Tjørstad

Women's freestyle
 Grace Bullen

References

Nations at the 2015 European Games
European Games
2015